Kando may refer to:

 Jiandao, China, Kando in Korean
 Kando, Burkina Faso, a village in Burkina Faso
 Kálmán Kandó a Hungarian engineer and inventor of the Kandó system of railway electrification 
 Yoko Kando (born 1974), Japanese swimmer

See also
 Gando (disambiguation)